Abd al-Zahra is a male Arabic given name. The name is built from the Arabic words Abd, al- and Zahra, and means Servant of Zahra. It is commonly associated with Shi'ites, who especially revere Fatimah Zahra. The name is forbidden for Sunnis, who may not use any names implying servitude to anything besides God. It may refer to:

Abdelzahra Othman Mohammed, alternate name of Ezzedine Salim (1943–2004), Iraqi politician
Dia Abdul Zahra Kadim (ca. 1970–2007), Iraqi politico-religious activist
Alaa Abdul-Zahra (born 1985), Iraqi footballer
Mohammed Abdul-Zahra (born 1989), Iraqi footballer

See also
Abdolreza
Abdul Hussein

Arabic masculine given names
Iranian masculine given names